Midway is an unincorporated community in Grass Township, Spencer County, in the U.S. state of Indiana.

History
A post office was established at Midway in 1831, and remained in operation until it was discontinued in 1905. The community was laid out in 1854.

Geography

References

Unincorporated communities in Spencer County, Indiana
Unincorporated communities in Indiana